Clarence W. Belt (27 February 1890 in Xenia, Ohio – 15 September 1969 in Moraine, Ohio) was an American racecar driver. He failed to qualify for the 1925 Indianapolis 500 but qualified for the 1928 race. In 1927 he attempted two other Championship Car races but failed to qualify for both of them.

Belt has the distinction of becoming the first driver ever to qualify a V-type engine at Indianapolis.

Indianapolis 500 results

References

External links
Clarence Belt statistics at ChampCarStats.com

Indianapolis 500 drivers
Belt, C.W.
1890 births
1969 deaths
Racing drivers from Ohio